Non linear piezoelectric effects in polar semiconductors are the manifestation that the strain induced piezoelectric polarization depends not just on the product of the first order piezoelectric coefficients times the strain tensor components but also on the product of the second order (or higher) piezoelectric coefficients times products of the strain tensor components. The idea was put forward for zincblende GaAs and InAs semiconductors since 2006, and then extended to all commonly used wurtzite and zincblende semiconductors. Given the difficulty of finding direct experimental evidence for the existence of these effects, there are different schools of thought on how one can calculate reliably all the piezoelectric coefficients.
On the other hand, there is widespread agreement on the fact that non linear effects are rather large and comparable to the linear terms (first order). Indirect experimental evidence of the existence of these effects has been reported in the literature in relation to GaN and InN semiconductor optoelectronic devices.

History
Non linear piezoelectric effects in polar semiconductors were first reported in 2006 by G.Bester et al. and by M.A. Migliorato et al., in relation to zincblende GaAs and InAs. Different methods were used in the seminal papers and while the influence of second (and third) order piezoelectric coefficients was generally recognized as being comparable to first order, fully ab initio and what is currently known as Harrison's model, appeared to predict slightly different results, particularly for the magnitude of the first order coefficients.

Formalism
While first order piezoelectric coefficients are of the form eij, the second and third order coefficients are in the form of a higher rank tensor, expressed as eijk and eijkl. The piezoelectric polarization would then be expressed in terms of products of the piezoelectric coefficients and strain components, products of two strain components, and products of three strain components for the first, second, and third order approximation respectively.

Available Non Linear Piezoelectric Coefficients
Since 2006 many more articles were published on the subject. Non linear piezoelectric coefficients are now available for many different semiconductor materials and crystal structures:
 zincblende GaAs and InAs, under pseudomorphic strain, using Harrison's Model
 zincblende GaAs and InAs, for any combination of diagonal strain components, using Harrison's Model
 All common III-V semiconductors in the zincblende structure  using ab initio
 GaN, AlN, InN  in the Wurtzite crystal structure, using Harrison's Model
 GaN, AlN, InN in the Wurtzite crystal structure, using ab initio
 ZnO in the Wurtzite crystal structure, using Harrison's Model
 Wurtzite crystal structure GaN, InN, AlN and ZnO, using ab initio
 Wurtzite crystal structure GaAs, InAs, GaP and InP, using Harrison's Model

Experimental Evidence
Particularly for III-N semiconductors, the influence of non linear piezoelectricity was discussed in the context of light-emitting diodes:
 Influence of external pressure 
 Increased efficiency

See also

 Piezotronics
 Piezoelectricity
 Light-emitting diode
 Wurtzite crystal structure

References

Nanoelectronics
Semiconductor devices
Semiconductors